The Brenham Downtown Historic District was added to the National Register of Historic Places in 2004. Buildings in the district were designed by Alfred C. Finn, James Wetmore, and others in Classical Revival and other styles.  Included in the district is the Simon Theatre.

The 1939 Washington County Courthouse is also a contributing property to the district.

Gallery

See also

National Register of Historic Places listings in Washington County, Texas
Recorded Texas Historic Landmarks in Washington County

References

External links

National Register of Historic Places in Washington County, Texas
Neoclassical architecture in Texas
Italianate architecture in Texas
Geography of Washington County, Texas
History of Brenham, Texas
Brenham, Texas
Historic districts on the National Register of Historic Places in Texas